Pasiphila heighwayi is a moth in the family Geometridae. It is found in New Zealand. The species was described from the Banks Peninsula and later found along the Waitohi River.

The larvae feed on the flowers of Veronica traversii.

References

Moths described in 1927
heighwayi
Moths of New Zealand